Arabhi or Aarabhi (pronounced ārabhi) is a ragam (musical scale) in Carnatic music (South Indian classical music). It is a Janya raga (derived scale), whose Melakarta raga (parent scale, also known as janaka) is Shankarabharanam, 29th in the 72 Melakarta raga system. It is a combination of the pentatonic scale Shuddha Saveri (or Durga in Hindustani Music) and the sampurna raga scale Shankarabharanam.

Arabhi is a raga that dates back to 7 AD. Originally, it was called as pazhanthakkam in Ancient Tamil music. A very auspicious ragam that emanates Veera rasa (valour), Arabhi is one of the five Ghana ragams that shine with special brilliance when Thanam is played on Veena.

Structure and Lakshana 

Its  structure (ascending and descending scale) is as follows (see swaras in Carnatic music for details on below notation and terms):

 : 
 : 

Arabhi raga is an Owdava-sampoorna raga meaning,  5 swaras occur in the arohana (so it is called Owdava) and in avarohana all swaras occur (so sampoorna).

It is a raga without much gamakas and frequency variations, relying instead on flat notes. The important point is the swara "ga" always comes very close to "ma" so when we sing the phrase "ma ga ri" it sounds like "ma ma ri". Likewise the swara "ni" always comes very close to the swara "sa" hence when we sing the phrase "sa ni da" it sounds like "sa sa da".

The closest raga to this one is Devagandhari. There are few aspects which make Arabhi different (though both share the same ascending and desce
 In Arabhi the swara "ga" is close to "ma" but in Devagandhari it is not the same.
 The swara "ri" is not fluctuated in Arabhi but it is given "asaivu" in Devagandhari
 The phrase "pa ma da sa" should not be sung in Arabhi, as it is exclusive for Devagandhari
 Devagandhari is sung with gamakas and vilambita kala prayogas (usages with elongated notes)
 Devagandhari is sung with deergha gandharam (elongated G3)

Arabhi raga is a very energetic and it lends itself to creativity in brigas (fast-paced swara usages) more than gamakas.

Popular Compositions 
The 3rd of Pancharatna Kritis (five gems of compositions), Sadhinchanae(also known as "Samayaniki Tagu Mataladene") by Saint Thyagaraja is a famous composition set in Arabhi raga. Here we can note that Thyagaraja uses phrases like "sa sa da" in the charanam although there are phrases like "sa ni da" also.

Here are some more compositions set to Arabhi.

Film Songs

Language:Tamil

Title Song

Notes

References

External links
 Dr. P.Venkatraman's Page - Arabhi Raga Basics
 CAC Newsletter-Comparing Arabhi and Devagandhari
 Compositions at karnatik.com

Janya ragas